Irshad (also known Ali Irshad)  is an Indian actor in Malayalam films. He hails from Kechery, Thrissur.
He has acted in a number of Malayalam television serials and telefilms besides acting in films.

Career

He has acted in numerous award-winning art-house films including those directed by acclaimed filmmakers such as Pavithran, T. V. Chandran, P. T. Kunju Muhammed, and K. R. Mohanan. He has also appeared in supporting roles in a few mainstream films. He debuted as an actor in Sibi Malayil's campus story Pranayavarnangal (Colours of Love, 1998). Garshom (1999), his first offbeat film, gave him a place in parallel cinema. Several significant roles in parallel cinema made him a well-known face in art house movies. His notable films include T. V. Chandran's Dany (2002), Paadam Onnu: Oru Vilapam (Lesson One: A Wail, 2003), Vilapangalkkappuram (2008) and Bhoomi Malayalam (The Mother Earth, 2009), P. T. Kunju Muhammed's Paradesi (Foreigner, 2007), Madhu Kaithapram's Madhya Venal (2009), Priyanandanan's Pulijanmam (Tiger Life, 2006) and Bhakthajanangalude Sradhakku (2011), and Dr. Biju's Veettilekkulla Vazhi (The Way Home, 2010).

Personal life
He was born to Puthenpura Nalakathu Abdu and Nafeesa, as fourth son among six children, at Kechery, Thrissur. He has four brothers and a sister. He is married to Ramseena, a bank employee. They have a son, Arshaq.

Filmography

Film

Television

References

External links

AliIrshad at MSI

Male actors from Thrissur
Male actors in Malayalam cinema
Indian male film actors
Living people
1979 births
Male actors in Malayalam television
Indian male television actors
20th-century Indian male actors
21st-century Indian male actors